The 1961 VPI Gobblers football team represented the Virginia Polytechnic Institute in the 1961 NCAA University Division football season.

Schedule

Players
The following players were members of the 1961 football team according to the roster published in the 1962 edition of The Bugle, the Virginia Tech yearbook.

References

VPI
Virginia Tech Hokies football seasons
VPI Gobblers football